Brooke Apshkrum (born September 9, 1999 in Calgary, Alberta) is a Canadians luger.

Career

2015–2016 season
Apshkrum won the gold medal in the girls' singles event at the second Winter Youth Olympics in Lillehammer, Norway.

2017–2018 season
In December 2017, Apshkrum was named to Canada's Olympic team for the 2018 Winter Olympics in Pyeongchang, South Korea.

References

External links 
 
 
 

 

1999 births
Living people
Canadian female lugers
Youth Olympic gold medalists for Canada
Olympic lugers of Canada
Lugers at the 2016 Winter Youth Olympics
Lugers at the 2018 Winter Olympics
Lugers from Calgary